Base Aérea de Fortaleza – BAFZ  is a base of the Brazilian Air Force, located in Fortaleza, Brazil.

It shares some facilities with Pinto Martins International Airport.

History
Belém Air Force Base has its origins on the 6th Aviation Regiment created on 15 May 1933. The Air Force Base was created on 22 May 1941 by Decree 3,302.

Units
Since January 2017 there are no permanent flying units assigned to Fortaleza Air Force Base. Whenever needed, the aerodrome is used as a support facility to other air units of the Brazilian Air Force, Navy and Army.

Former Units
December 2001–October 2013: 1st Squadron of the 5th Aviation Group (1º/5ºGAv) Rumba. The squadron was moved to Natal Air Force Base.

Access
The base is located 6 km from downtown Fortaleza.

Gallery
This gallery displays aircraft that have been based at Fortaleza. The gallery is not comprehensive.

See also
List of Brazilian military bases
Pinto Martins International Airport

References

External links

Ceará
Brazilian Air Force
Brazilian Air Force bases
Buildings and structures in Ceará
Fortaleza